Yesteryear may refer to:

 The previous year
 Nostalgia, years gone by

Film and TV

 "Yesteryear" (Star Trek: The Animated Series), a 1973 episode of the animated series Star Trek
 Yesteryear (documentary series), an HBO documentary series follow up to Time Was

Music
 Yesteryear (quartet), a barbershop quartet
 Yesteryear (album), or the title track, by Cosmo's Midnight, 2020
 "Yesteryear", a 2007 song by Malibu from Robo-Sapiens
 "Yesteryear", a 2011 song by the Dears from Degeneration Street

See also
 Yesteryear Village, a history park and exhibit in West Palm Beach, Florida
 Voyage from Yesteryear, a 1982 science fiction novel by James P. Hogan